Clifford Carter (born August 10, 1952) is an American keyboardist, musical director, composer and arranger. He has sometimes been credited as "Cliff Carter".

Carter is known for his performances with such artists as James Taylor, Bruce Springsteen, Paul Simon, Rosanne Cash, Michael Franks, Art Garfunkel, Cyndi Lauper, Idina Menzel, Patti Scialfa, Shunzo Ohno, Linda Ronstadt, Susana Raya, Herbie Mann and as a member of the groups Elements, Grace Pool, and the 24th Street Band.

In 1993 he released a solo album, Walkin' into the Sun, which featured nine of his own compositions. The album is a combination of vocal and instrumental music.

In 2010, Clifford Carter was a featured pianist at Carnegie Hall, performing 'Too Hot To Handel' with the Baltimore Symphony Orchestra, conducted by Marin Alsop.

Discography

Solo albums
 Walkin' into the Sun — (1993)

Selected credits with other artists
 Rory Block — I'm Every Woman — (2002)
 Rosanne Cash — Interiors — (1990)
 Natalie Cole: 
 Snowfall on the Sahara — (1999)
 Greatest Hits, Vol. 1 — (2000)
 Mark Egan: 
 Mosaic — (1985)
 Blown Away; (1985)
 Beyond Words — (1990)
 Freedom Town — (2001)
Bill Evans
 The Alternative Man– (1985) 
 Michael Franks: 
Skin Dive — (1985)
Camera Never Lies — (1987)
Michael Franks Anthology: The Art of Love — (2003)
 Morgana King: 
 This Is Always — (1992)
 Every Once in a While — (1997)
 Yusef Lateef:
Autophysiopsychic (CTI, 1977)
 Chuck Loeb
Magic Fingers (DMP, 1989) with Andy LaVerne
Moon, the Stars & the Setting Sun (1998)
 Michael Manring — Drastic Measures — (1991)
 Amanda McBroom — Waiting Heart — (1997)
 Patti Scialfa — 23rd Street Lullaby — (2004)
 Paul Simon — You're the One — (2000)
Jeremy Steig
Firefly (CTI, 1977)
 James Taylor: 
 That's Why I'm Here — (1985)
 Never Die Young — (1988)
 New Moon Shine — (1991)
 Live — (1993)
 Best Live — (1994)
 Hourglass — (1997)
 Greatest Hits, Vol. 2 — (2000)
 October Road — (2002)
 Kate Taylor — Beautiful Road — (2003)
 Village People — Live and Sleazy — (1979)
 Original Soundtracks: 
 A Chorus Line — (1985)

See also 
List of ambient music artists

References

External links
Clifford Carter's Official Web Site

American male songwriters
American session musicians
Living people
People from Briarcliff Manor, New York
1952 births
21st-century American keyboardists
Elements (band) members
21st-century American male musicians